Microcalicha minima is a moth of the family Geometridae. It was first described by the English entomologist William Warren in 1896.

Description

It is a small dark brown moth, similar in appearance to Lophobates mesotoechia but it has pale fawn and brown patches subapically at the costa of the forewing between the postmedial and submarginal, and tornus on the hindwing.

Distribution
It occurs in Borneo, Sumatra, and the north-eastern Himalayas.

References 

Microcalicha minima
Taxa named by William Warren (entomologist)
Moths described in 1896
Insects of Brunei
Insects of Indonesia